The 2004 Georgetown Hoyas football team was an American football team that represented Georgetown University during the 2004 NCAA Division I-AA football season. Georgetown finished last in the Patriot League.

In their 12th year under head coach Bob Benson, the Hoyas compiled a 3–8 record. Ryan Goethals, Brandon Small and Frank Terrazzino were the team captains.

The Hoyas were outscored 280 to 174. Their winless (0–6) conference record was the worst in the seven-team Patriot League standings. 

Georgetown played its home games at Harbin Field on the university campus in Washington, D.C.

Schedule

References

Georgetown
Georgetown Hoyas football seasons
Georgetown Hoyas football